George Bower may refer to:

George Bower (footballer) (1884–1964), Australian rules footballer
George Bower (medallist) ( 1664–1689), English medallist
George Bower (priest) (1748–1800), Archdeacon of Richmond
George Bower (rugby union) (born 1992), New Zealand rugby player
George Bower (ironfounder) (1827–1911), English inventor